

List of Ambassadors

Yossi Amrani 2019 -
Irit Ben-Abba 2014 - 2019
Arye Mekel 2010 - 2014
Ali Yihye 2006 - 2010
Ram Aviram 2003 - 2006
David Sasson 2001 - 2003
Ran Curiel 1996 - 2001 
David Sasson 1990 - 1996
Moshe Gilboa 1986 - 1990
Nissim Yaish 1976 - 1981
Yehuda Gaulan 1970 - 1974
Shmuel Kapel 1962
Yehuda Horam 1956 - 1957

References

Greece
Israel